Kokshin is a Russian masculine surname, its feminine counterpart is Kokshina. It derives from the Russian given name Koksha, a derivative of Nikolai, and is sometimes misspelled as Kakshin or Kakshina. The surname may refer to
Ruslan Kokshin (born 1979), Russian military officer

References

Russian-language surnames